The Skyline Correctional Center (also SCC) is a Level 1 minimum security prison facility at Cañon City in the state of Colorado. The Prison was opened in 1957 with 60 beds and houses (as for May 19, 2014) 249 male offenders. Inmates assigned to SCC are within 60 months of their parole eligibility date and in most cases have attended numerous treatment programs offered through the Colorado Department of Corrections.

In 1990 the Level I and II facilities located in the East Cañon Complex were combined under one administration and became known as the CMC (Cañon Minimum Centers). The SCC achieved its original American Correctional Association accreditation in 2002 and has maintained national accreditation since.

The Warden of this facility was Pamela Ploughe.

This facility was closed on January, 2021.

References

Prisons in Colorado
Buildings and structures in Fremont County, Colorado
Penal system in Colorado
1957 establishments in Colorado